Varchaq (also known as Varcha and Warcha) is a village in Kuh Sardeh Rural District, in the Central District of Malayer County, Hamadan Province, Iran. At the 2006 census, its population was 565, in 133 families.

References 

Populated places in Malayer County